Il Giornalino di Gian Burrasca is an Italian novel by Vamba (aka Luigi Bertelli).

It was first published, between 1907 and 1908, in sequential installments in the children's magazine  Il giornalino della Domenica, and in 1912 it was published in book format. Set in Tuscany and partly in Rome, the book is imagined as the diary of Giannino Stoppani, nicknamed "Gian Burrasca" ("Johnny Tempest") because of his exuberant and restless behavior. The author Vamba also illustrated the book. 

The novel successfully attracted a large audience, especially among young readers. It was adapted into film in 1943 and 1982, and into a popular RAI TV-series starring Rita Pavone in 1964.

References 

Italian children's literature
1908 novels
1912 children's books
Novels first published in serial form
Works originally published in children's magazines
Italian novels adapted into films
Fictional diaries